Stena Horizon is a passenger and vehicle ferry operated by Stena Line. The vessel operates between Rosslare, Ireland and Cherbourg, France.

History
Stena Horizon was built in 2006 as the Cartour Beta.  She was constructed at the Italian shipyard of Cantiere Navale Visentini.

Caronte & Tourist

Upon completion the vessel was chartered to Sicilian ferry operator Caronte & Tourist. The vessel operated between Salerno and Messina until replaced by a new ship in May 2011.

Celtic Link

In October 2011 the vessel entered service with Irish ferry operator Celtic Link Ferries replacing the Norman Voyager.  Prior to entering service the ship was renamed Celtic Horizon.

Stena Line

On 26 February 2014 Stena Line announced that they had agreed to purchase Celtic Link Ferries with effect from 31 March 2014. Celtic Horizon was renamed Stena Horizon and is managed by Northern Marine Ferries. Stena Horizon carries a maximum of 660 passengers, though she has a design capacity for 972.

Sisterships
Stena Horizon is the third of four near-identical ships built by Cantiere Navale Visentini. The other ships being Stena Mersey, Stena Lagan and Cartour Gamma.

References

2005 ships
Ferries of the Republic of Ireland
Ships built by Cantiere Navale Visentini
Ships built in Italy